Cellfactor may refer to:

CellFactor may refer to:
CellFactor: Psychokinetic Wars, a 2009 downloadable video game
CellFactor: Revolution, a 2007 tech demo for PhysX cards